Mario Longo (born March 12, 1980) is a former American soccer player who played for Columbus Crew in the MLS.

Career statistics

Club

Notes

References

1980 births
Living people
American soccer players
Association football midfielders
Columbus Crew players
MLS Pro-40 players
Cincinnati Riverhawks players
North Carolina Fusion U23 players
Major League Soccer players
A-League (1995–2004) players
USL Second Division players